Patton 360°, also written as Patton 360, is a weekly television series that originally ran from April 10 to June 26, 2009, on the History channel. It was produced by Flight 33 Productions in Los Angeles (the same company that produced Battle 360°), and features a mixture of CGI, archival footage, recreations, and interviews with World War II veterans and historians. The series follows General George S. Patton and the units he commanded, from the Operation Torch landings in Morocco in 1942, through the campaigns in North Africa and Sicily, and in the battles across Northwest Europe.

The episodes were written by Samuel K. Dolan and Jim Hense, and produced by Rob Beemer, Brian Thompson, Samuel K. Dolan, associate producer Ryan Hurst, and executive producers Louis Tarantino and Douglas Cohen for Flight 33 Productions and Carl Lindahl for the History channel.

Veterans 
The producers of Patton 360 interviewed dozens of veterans for the series. Among the veteran contributors were Medal of Honor recipients Walter Ehlers, John D. Hawk and Distinguished Service Cross recipients Maj. General Kelley Lemmon, Colonel James Herbert (Jimmie) Leach and Major Abraham Baum. Retired Brigadier General Albin Irzyk and retired Lieutenant General Orwin C. Talbot were also interviewed. The series included interviews from dozens of other veterans, both enlisted soldiers and retired commissioned officers, who served in the many Infantry and Armored Divisions that Patton fought with in North Africa, Sicily and with Third Army in Europe.

Among the divisions covered in the series were the 1st Infantry Division, the 4th Armored Division, the 2nd Armored Division, 5th Infantry Division, 90th Infantry Division, and 95th Infantry Division. Veterans from numerous independent tank battalions, artillery units, and anti-tank battalions were also covered in the program. Two naval veterans, Captain Franklyn Dailey, Jr. and Arthur Beaumont were also interviewed. William McBurney appeared in several of the later episodes and recounted his stories as a member of the 761st Tank Battalion.

The final episode of the series was dedicated to veteran Fred Cottriel of the 737th Tank Battalion, who died in 2008 only days after conducting an interview with the show's producers.

Notable Commentator 
Among the many commentators in the series was Colonel H. R. McMaster.

Episodes

References

External links
 

History (American TV channel) original programming
Documentary television series about World War II
2000s American documentary television series
2009 American television series debuts
2009 American television series endings